9th FFCC Awards 
December 22, 2004

Best Film: 
 Sideways 
The 9th Florida Film Critics Circle Awards, honoring the best in film for 2004, were held on 22 December 2004.

Winners
Best Actor: 
Jamie Foxx - Ray
Best Actress: 
Hilary Swank - Million Dollar Baby
Best Animated Film:
The Incredibles
Best Director:
Alexander Payne - Sideways
Best Documentary Film: 
Fahrenheit 9/11
Best Film: 
Sideways
Best Foreign Language Film: 
A Very Long Engagement (Un long dimanche de fiançailles) • France/United States
Best Supporting Actor: 
Thomas Haden Church - Sideways
Best Screenplay: 
Sideways - Alexander Payne and Jim Taylor
Best Supporting Actress: 
Laura Linney - Kinsey
Pauline Kael Breakout Award: 
Zach Braff - Garden State

2
2004 film awards